Jan Wincenty Hamerski (born 15 September 1951) is a Polish politician. He was elected to the Senate of Poland (10th term) representing the constituency of Nowy Sącz. He was also elected to the 9th term (2015–2019) of the Senate of Poland.

References 

Living people
1951 births
Place of birth missing (living people)
20th-century Polish politicians
21st-century Polish politicians
Members of the Senate of Poland 2015–2019
Members of the Senate of Poland 2019–2023